German submarine U-985 was a Type VIIC U-boat built for Nazi Germany's Kriegsmarine for service during World War II.
She was laid down on 18 September 1942 by Blohm & Voss, Hamburg as yard number 185, launched on 20 May 1943 and commissioned on 24 June 1943 under Kapitänleutnant Horst Wilhelm Kessler.

Design
German Type VIIC submarines were preceded by the shorter Type VIIB submarines. U-985 had a displacement of  when at the surface and  while submerged. She had two shafts and two  propellers.

U-985 was fitted with five  torpedo tubes (four fitted at the bow and one at the stern), fourteen torpedoes, one  SK C/35 naval gun, 220 rounds, and one twin  C/30 anti-aircraft gun. The boat had a complement of between forty-four and sixty.

Service history
The boat's career began with training at 5th U-boat Flotilla on 24 June 1943, followed by active service on 1 January 1944 as part of the 7th Flotilla for the remainder of her service.

Wolfpacks
U-985 took part in four wolfpacks, namely:
 Stürmer (26 January – 3 February 1944)
 Igel 1 (3 – 17 February 1944)
 Hai 1 (17 – 22 February 1944)
 Preussen (22 February – 10 March 1944)

Fate
U-985 was decommissioned on 15 November 1944 following heavy damage suffered on 23 October 1944 when she hit a German mine at Lister in Southern Norway. She returned to Kristiansand and taken out of service. She was captured at the end of the war and broken up.

Summary of raiding history

References

Bibliography

External links

German Type VIIC submarines
1943 ships
U-boats commissioned in 1943
World War II submarines of Germany
Ships built in Hamburg
Maritime incidents in October 1944